The Rheineck–Walzenhausen mountain railway (RhW) is a  long rack railway in Switzerland. It links Rheineck station, in the municipality of Rheineck and the canton of St Gallen, with the village and health resort of Walzenhausen, in the canton of Appenzell Ausserrhoden. Passenger service on the line now forms part of the St. Gallen S-Bahn, branded as the S26.

The line is owned and operated by the Appenzell Railways company, which also operates several other railway lines in the two Appenzell cantons.

History 

The concession for the construction of a rail link between Rheineck and Walzenhausen was granted in 1889. The Drahtseilbahn-Gesellschaft Rheineck-Walzenhausen company started construction in 1895 and the line opened on 27 June 1896. As constructed, the line was a water operated funicular railway that linked the current upper station at Walzenhausen with a lower station at Ruderbach, some  short of Rheineck station. In 1909, a connecting tram line was opened, initially operated by a gasolene powered tram and later electrified. The owning company would subsequently change its name to Bergbahn Rheineck-Walzenhausen AG.

By the 1950s the funicular was showing from its age, and it was finally closed on 1 May 1958 as the result of a broken axle. The connecting tramway was regauged and connected to the new rack railway, although retaining its adhesion operation, and the resulting line was electrified at 600 V DC. To operate the new line, a single four-wheeled railcar, BDeh 1/2 1, was built in 1958.

In 2006 the Bergbahn Rheineck-Walzenhausen AG company was merged into the Appenzell Railways. The 1958-built car remains the only rolling stock on the line, and in 2014 was given a full overhaul, returning to work in May of that year. During the overhaul period, the line was replaced by a bus service.

Operation 

Approximately  of the line is equipped with the Riggenbach rack system, whist the rest of the line operates using rail adhesion.

The S26 service starts from its own terminus, located on platform 1 of Rheineck's main line railway station. For about the first  the line parallels the Swiss Federal Railway's Chur–Rorschach railway, before bearing right and crossing the road on a level crossing to reach the stop at Ruderbach. The station building here incorporates the line's single track depot, accessed via the line's only set of points. Here the line joins the route of its funicular predecessor, and engages rack operation.

The S26 operates one or two return journeys per hour, depending on the time of day, with a single journey time of 9 minutes. Service is provided by the line's single four-wheeled railcar, BDeh 1/2 1. If this is unavailable for any reason, a substitute bus service is provided.

A bus service links Walzenhausen with the upper station of the Rorschach–Heiden railway at Heiden, thus providing the opportunity for a round trip via both mountain railways. The final link between Rorschach and Rheineck can be achieved using the St. Margrethen–Rorschach line, or by ship on Lake Constance.

Route 
  – 

 Rheineck
 
 
 Walzenhausen

Gallery

References

External links 
 

Mountain railways
Defunct railway companies of Switzerland
Rack railways in Switzerland
Transport in Appenzell Ausserrhoden
Transport in the canton of St. Gallen
1200 mm gauge railways in Switzerland